Howard Dyer Jr. (October 4, 1915 - December 22, 1986) was an American lawyer and politician. He was a member of the Mississippi State Senate from 1976 to 1986 and a member of the Mississippi House of Representatives from 1940 to 1944.

Biography 
Howard Dyer Jr. was born on October 4, 1915, in Greenville, Mississippi. He graduated from Davidson College and the University of Mississippi School of Law. He represented Washington County in the Mississippi House of Representatives for one term from 1940 to 1944. He then represented the 22nd District in the Mississippi State Senate for 2 terms from 1976 to 1984, and was elected to a third term but died before it ended. While still a member of the Senate, he died on December 22, 1986, in his home in Greenville, Mississippi.

References 

1915 births
1986 deaths
Mississippi state senators
Members of the Mississippi House of Representatives
People from Greenville, Mississippi